Bright is a post-rock and ambient music group based in Brooklyn, New York.

Background 
Bright formed in Boston, Massachusetts in 1993 initially as a recording project, with Mark Dwinell (guitar, vocals) and Joe LaBrecque (drums) creating songs with minimal vocals, extensive Krautrock-influenced improvisation and repeating measures. Initial raw sessions were documented at the Albatross Guest House on a 4-track recording machine and were later overdubbed. A cassette tape culled from these recordings initially released on Eek records made its way into the hands of Ben Goldberg at Ba Da Bing! records. To fill out the group and facilitate live performance Bright brought more musicians into the fold – Jay Dubois (bass) and Paul LaBrecque (guitar, trumpet)

In 1996, they released their eponymous self-titled debut on Ba Da Bing! records with veteran studio engineer Jacques Cohen (Mercury Rev, Silver Apples, Jerkwater) recording.

In 1997, The Albatross Guest House 4 track sessions was released and Bright reverted to a duo by the following year. During that time, the group recorded the mostly instrumental Blue Christian for Darla Records Bliss Out series. Parting ways with Jay and Paul, Bright recorded Full Negative (or) Breaks in 1999.

In 2000, the band now included Michael Torres (electric guitar, nylon string guitar, violin) and Mike Cory (bass guitar) and covered Captain Beefheart's Korn Ring Finger for a tribute album to frontman Don Van Vliet and his Magic Band.

At the close of 2001, Bright went on hiatus; Mark Dwinell recorded his solo debut NONLOC in 2002 (including various back-up by Torres) . In 2003, Bright began performing again sporadically, at times a six piece with all former members performing, and also picking up Nate Longcope before heading back to the studio in 2004 to record Bells Break Their Towers, released by Strange Attractors Audio House in 2005.

After Bright dissolved, Mark Dwinell relocated from Boston to New York City and went on to found the synth trio Forma. They released their debut album on Spectrum Spools in 2011 and remain active as of 2016.

Discography

LP Recordings 
 Bright (1995 cassette-only release on Eek, limited to 100 copies)
 Bright (1996 release on Ba Da Bing!)
 The Albatross Guest House (1997 release on Darla)
 Blue Christian (1998 release that also served as Bright's contribution to the Bliss Out series on Darla)
 Full Negative (or) Breaks (2000 release on Ba Da Bing!)
 The Miller Fantasies (2002 release on Ba Da Bing!)
 Bells Break Their Towers (2005 release on Strange Attractors)

Singles, EPs and Compilations 
 V/A Dreamboat "Cecilia" (1997 release on Cassiel Records)
 Fuxa / Bright "City and Metro" and "How I Reached Home" (1997 split 7-inch on Darla Records)
 "Plymouth Rock" b/w "Superstrings," "Nova" (1998 7-inch on Ba Da Bing!)
 V/A Badaboom Gramophone, Vol. 2 (1998 release on Ba Da Bing!)
 V/A Darla 100 (2000 release on Darla)
 V/A Neon Meate Dream of a Octafish: A Tribute to Captain Beefheart & His Magic Band (2003 release on Animal World)
 V/A Yeti No. 4 (2006 Yeti Magazine CD compilation)

Trivia 
An album entitled My Life and Style distributed by The Orchard is often misattributed to this band. The recording was done by a little-known hip hop outfit that happened to use the same moniker (they spell their name "BRiGHT").
A CD single, "Turning Point," by a Swiss pop band also called Bright appeared in 2006; it is mistakenly included with the band's releases on retail and informational websites.
Paul LaBrecque, who appeared on Bright's debut CD, went on to become a member of Sunburned Hand of the Man, the Other Method, Astral Blessing, and others; he also contributed to Wedlock (album) in 2005, joined with Sunburned member John Maloney and Thurston Moore of Sonic Youth for a 2006 Belgian performance.
Jonathan Lamaster of Cul de Sac began performing regularly with Bright for live performances in 2005.

External links 
Band bio from Strange Attractors Audio House
Feature on Mark Dwinell from the Boston Phoenix
Review of Bright live from the Boston Phoenix

Musical groups from Boston
American post-rock groups
Darla Records artists